Gamma Ceti (γ Ceti, abbreviated Gamma Cet, γ Cet) is a triple star system in the equatorial constellation of Cetus. It has a combined apparent visual magnitude of 3.47. Based upon parallax measurements, this star is located at a distance of about 80 light-years (24.4 parsecs) from the Sun.

The three components are designated Gamma Ceti A (officially named Kaffaljidhma , the traditional name for the entire system), B and C.

Nomenclature
γ Ceti (Latinised to Gamma Ceti) is the system's Bayer designation. The designations of the three components as Gamma Ceti A, B and C derive from the convention used by the Washington Multiplicity Catalog (WMC) for multiple star systems, and adopted by the International Astronomical Union (IAU). The close pair AB is also designated HIP 12706, HD 16970, and HR 804. The system of A, B, and C is collectively designated GJ 106.1 in the Gliese Catalogue of Nearby Stars.

The IAU Working Group on Star Names (WGSN) approved the name Kaffaljidhma for the component Gamma Ceti A on February 1, 2017.

In Chinese astronomy, meaning 'Circular Celestial Granary', refers to an asterism consisting of Gamma Ceti, Alpha Ceti, Kappa1 Ceti, Lambda Ceti, Mu Ceti, Xi1 Ceti, Xi2 Ceti, Nu Ceti, Delta Ceti, 75 Ceti, 70 Ceti, 63 Ceti and 66 Ceti.

Triple system
Gamma Ceti appears to be a triple star system. The inner pair (A and B) have an angular separation of 2.6 arcseconds. The primary component of this pair (A) is an A-type main sequence star with a stellar classification of A3 V and a visual magnitude of 3.6. The fainter secondary component (B) is an F-type main sequence star that has a classification of F3 V and a magnitude of 6.6. The contrasting colors of these two stars makes them a popular target of amateur astronomers. The two can be resolved with a small,  aperture telescope under ideal seeing conditions, although at times they can be a challenge to resolve even with a much larger scope.

At a wide separation of 840 arcseconds is component C, a dim, magnitude 10.2 K-type star with the designation . It has a spectral classification of K5V. There are several other stars brighter and closer to Gamma Ceti than  – , HD 16985, and  – but they are all more distant background stars.

Properties
At the estimated distance of this system, this yields a physical size of about 1.9 times the radius of the Sun. Gamma Ceti is about 300 million years old, and it appears to be a member of the stream of stars loosely associated with the Ursa Major Moving Group. The primary has been examined for an excess of infrared emission that would suggest the presence of circumstellar matter, but none was found.

References

External links
 Information about Kaffaljidhma on STARS
 Gamma Ceti on AAS WorldWide Telescope

Cetus (constellation)
Ceti, Gamma
Kaffaljidhma
Ceti, 86
A-type main-sequence stars
F-type main-sequence stars
K-type main-sequence stars
012706
016970
0804
Durchmusterung objects